Serenade for Horace  is an album by the jazz drummer Louis Hayes, released in 2017. It is a tribute to Horace Silver, Hayes's former bandleader.

The album peaked at No. 23 on Billboard'''s Jazz Albums chart.

Production
The album was produced by Don Was and Dezron Douglas. Gregory Porter contributed vocals to "Song for My Father". "Hastings Street", about Detroit's Black Bottom neighborhood, is the only song penned by Hayes.

Critical receptionThe New York Times wrote that the album "finds Hayes swinging briskly as he revisits the tunes he played in the early years, when he helped define the classic hard-bop sound." DownBeat noted that "some of the album’s best playing ... can be found on the heads, thanks to arrangements that treat the rhythm parts as though they were as integral as the melody—which, of course, they are." 

The Milwaukee Journal Sentinel opined that Hayes "gathers up a fine bunch of musicians to buttress his rhythmic tribute to and interpretation of Horace Silver." The Buffalo News'' panned the album, concluding that "the best thing about this disc, by far, are Hayes' personal and wonderful notes."

Track listing 
 Ecaroh
 Señor Blues
 Song for My Father
 Hastings Street
 Strollin’
 Juicy Lucy
 Silver’s Serenade
 Lonely Woman
 Summer in Central Park
 St. Vitus Dance
 Room 608

Personnel 
Louis Hayes – drums
Abraham Burton – tenor saxophone
Steve Nelson – vibraphone
David Bryant – piano
Dezron Douglas – bass
Josh Evans – trumpet

References 

Louis Hayes albums
2017 albums
Blue Note Records albums